Khlong Khoi is one of the twelve subdistricts (tambon) of Pak Kret District, in Nonthaburi Province, Thailand. Neighbouring subdistricts are (from north clockwise) Lat Lum Kaeo, Khlong Phra Udom (Pathum Thani Province), Bang Khu Wat, Bang Tanai, Khlong Phra Udom (Nonthaburi Province), Bang Phlap, Lahan, Lam Pho, Lahan and Namai. In 2020 it had a total population of 8,383 people.

Administration

Central administration
The subdistrict is subdivided into 12 administrative villages (muban).

Local administration
The whole area of the subdistrict is covered by Khlong Khoi Subdistrict Administrative Organization.

References

External links
Website of Khlong Khoi Subdistrict Administrative Organization

Tambon of Nonthaburi province
Populated places in Nonthaburi province